The Shaker Museum and Library, officially known as Shaker Museum | Mount Lebanon, is a museum and research library concerned with the Shakers, a Protestant religious denomination founded in America by Ann Lee and her followers in 1774, and known more formally as the United Society of Believers in Christ's Second Appearing. The  museum and library collections relate to Shaker life and culture and are based in New Lebanon, New York.

Originating in 1950 with the private collections of the museum's founder John S. Williams Sr., the Shaker Museum was accredited in 1972 by the American Alliance of Museums. In 1986 it was named a "Primary Organization" by the New York State Council on the Arts. The museum's administrative offices are located in Old Chatham. Guided tours, exhibitions, and special events take place at the museum's main location - the North Family historic site at Mount Lebanon Shaker Village. Their Visitor Center & Museum Store is located in the Granary, built in 1838 and located at 202 Shaker Road, New Lebanon, NY 12125.

In 2004, the Shaker Museum began expanding to the Mount Lebanon Shaker Village in New Lebanon, New York, in an area of historic Shaker buildings located at the site of the former North Family of Shakers, north of Darrow School. Currently, the Museum operates programs and guided tours of the site during the summer-fall season. The North Family's Great Stone Barn, built in 1859 and listed on the World Monuments Fund, is undergoing a large-scale stabilization and restoration through 2014, with Phase 1 being completed in November of that year. In April 2014, the museum expanded its site by acquiring 61 acres of land comprising the historic North Pastures, bringing the total amount of protected land owned by the museum to over 90 acres. The museum exhibits Shaker objects from its collections alongside modern and contemporary artwork, furniture, and photography.

Historically, the New Lebanon Shaker Village was the home of Lucy Wright, head of the Shaker ministry 1796-1821, Isaac N. Youngs, who lived there 1807-1865, and Issachar Bates, a notable Shaker missionary who returned from the West and died in 1837.

The North Family was particularly known for its advocacy of equal rights for women, the peace movement, and spiritualism. They hosted a national peace convention in August 1905.

In addition, the North Family published a number of works from 1870 into the early twentieth century. Elder Frederick W. Evans and his cohort of editors, poets, and authors were responsible for more than a hundred tracts and broadsides which included not only theology but also topics ranging from pacifism to the benefits of sparrows, land limitation, and vegetarianism. Their more important works included:

-- The Manifesto (1870-1899). Also known as The Shaker or Shaker and Shakeress.

-- Mount Lebanon Cedar Boughs: original poems by the North family of Shakers (Buffalo: Peter Paul Company, 1895).

-- White, Anna and Leila S. Taylor. Shakerism: Its Meaning and Message (Columbus, Ohio: 1905).

References

External links 
 
 TripAdvisor entry

Museums established in 1972
Museums in Columbia County, New York
Shaker communities or museums
Institutions accredited by the American Alliance of Museums
Religious museums in New York (state)
Libraries in New York (state)
Decorative arts museums in the United States